Rabat Observatory is an astronomical observatory located in Rabat, Morocco. It was founded in 1999 and has a 51-cm telescope. In addition to Oukaïmeden observatory, it is one of the main existing observatories in Morocco.

See also 
 List of astronomical observatories
Oukaïmeden observatory

References 

Astronomical observatories in Morocco
Buildings and structures in Rabat
1999 establishments in Morocco
20th-century architecture in Morocco